Waters is a crater on Mercury.  Its name was adopted by the IAU in 2012, after the American musician McKinley Morganfield, better known as Muddy Waters.

The crater has a bright ray system, as well as an unusual dark flow-feature associated with the southern rim.  The flow-feature is interpreted as impact melt.

References

Impact craters on Mercury